Tragedy at the Royal Circus is a 1928 German silent drama film directed by Alfred Lind and starring Bernhard Goetzke, Ellen Kürti, and Werner Pittschau.

The film's art direction was by Willi Herrmann and Bernhard Schwidewski

Cast

References

Bibliography

External links

1928 films
Films of the Weimar Republic
German silent feature films
German drama films
Films directed by Alfred Lind
1928 drama films
Circus films
Films produced by Seymour Nebenzal
German black-and-white films
Silent drama films
1920s German films